, better known as , later changed to , was a Japanese idol and musical singer. In 1985, she made her debut with the single "Satsui no Vacane".

She was diagnosed with acute myelogenous leukemia on January 5, 2005. At 4:38 A.M. on November 6, 2005, Honda died at the Juntendo University Hospital in Bunkyō, Tokyo.

Early life
Kudo was born in Japan on July 31, 1967 at Narimasu Maternity Hospital in Narimasu, Itabashi. Kudo's family initially lived in Shibamata, Katsushika but would end up moving to Asaka, Saitama where at an early age she would enroll in Asaka's Shirayuri Kindergarten.

Beginnings
As a child Kudo was very involved with singing, largely influenced by her mother who dreamed of becoming a singer. In Kudo's graduation collection from Asaka's 6th Elementary School in Aska City, she wrote that, "It would be nice if I could become an actress or singer." While at Asaka Daiichi Junior High School at the age of 14, she would audition for Star Tanjō!, where in the TV qualifying round she would sing "Hello Goodbye" by Yoshie Kashiwabara which would win her that round and advance her to the battle tournament round, for that she would sing "Blue Angel" by her cousin, Seiko Matsuda, however none of the production companies expressed interest and Kudo would not win the competition.

While Kudo was enrolled at Tokyo Seitoku University Junior & Senior High School in 1983, she would visit Harajuku because the record label Bondo Kikaku was recruiting a new member for the group called Shojotai. Bondo Kikaku had also participated in the show Star Tanjō!. While still working with Bondo Kikaku in 1984, she heard a demo of Meiko Nakahara's song "Kimitachi Kiwi Papaya Mango da ne", which had just become a hit, this lead Kudo to believe Bondo Kikaku's President, Keiji Takasugi was taking the company in the wrong direction, and would make her decide to become a solo artist.

In 1984, Kudo performed at the Nagasaki Kayo Festival, which was a television contest to where teenagers and young adults competed to become new idols by winning what was called the grand prix. On the show, Honda was highly evaluated by judges who noted her powerful voice and overwhelming singing ability which led her to win the Grand Prix part of the competition.

Following her success in the Nagasaki Kayo Festival, Kudo would make her debut under the name Minako Honda with the song "Satsui no Vacane", this lead her to receive a Japan Record Award for the best new artist of that year.

Looking to follow up on the success of "Satsui no Vacane", Honda would release "1986 nen no Marilyn", in which a controversy would arise from her performances, in which Honda would shake her hips suggestively while wearing a navel costume, at the time this was not common for idols and was thought to be offensive.

In 1988, she made an attempt to revive her dwindling career by forming an all girl rock group called "Minako with Wild Cats", the group however would disband a year later due to lack of any hit songs.

In 1990 a turning point came for her career. Honda had auditioned for a part in the Tokyo production of Broadway play Miss Saigon, she won out over 15,000 other candidates for the part of Kim. While still starring in the role as Kim in Miss Saigon in the 1990s, Honda visited The People's Republic of Vietnam. There she visited the famous Cu Chi Tunnels just outside Ho Chi Minh City. She was found by Vietnamese authorities having photographs taken of her in the Cu Chi Tunnels draped only in a Vietnamese flag. She was fined and expelled from Vietnam shortly after.  

She would go on to perform in leading roles in Fiddler on the Roof, The King and I, and Les Miserables.

Later career and illness
Towards the end of her life, she released several classical albums demonstrating her soprano singing voice, including religious works such as "Amazing Grace" and Ave Maria. She also sang theme songs for several anime programs.

She did not abandon pop music in her adult career; indeed, she became recognized for her vocal improvement in the adult pop genre. Her song "Tsubasa" is famous for the "long note" that she holds for 30 seconds.

In 2004, Honda would add a period to the end of her name; this was done because Honda believed there was judgment to her surname.

Honda became ill in late 2004, but still performed in December in spite of a fever and fatigue. When her cold-like symptoms failed to improve, she sought medical treatment and was diagnosed with acute myelogenous leukemia on January 5, 2005.

Honda was able to celebrate her 38th birthday at home feeling relatively well, but had a relapse shortly afterwards. Chromosome aberration was discovered and she received a dose of anticancer medicine from the United States to treat it. She recovered again briefly, but then suffered another relapse.

Death

Honda developed lung complications on October 21, and she lapsed into a coma on November 3. At 4:38 a.m. on November 6, 2005, Honda died at the Juntendo University Hospital in Bunkyō, Tokyo, officially from acute myelogenous leukemia. She was 38 at the time of her death.

Discography

Singles
Satsui No Vacance (殺意のバカンス Satsui No Bakansu, Vacation of the Urge To Kill) (April 21, 1985)
Suki To Iinasai (好きと言いなさい, Tell Me "I Love You") (July 20, 1985)
Aoi Shumatsu (青い週末, Blue Weekend) (August 31, 1985)
Temptation (September 28, 1985)
1986 Nen No Marilyn (1986年のマリリン Senkyuhyakuhachijūnen No Maririn, Marilyn in 1986) (February 5, 1986)
Sosotte (Seduce Me) (May 1, 1986)
Help (July 23, 1986)
The Cross -Ai No Jyujika- (愛の十字架, The Cross Of Love) (September 3, 1986)
Oneway Generation (February 4, 1987)
Crazy Nights (April 22, 1987)
Golden Days (May 11, 1987) released only in UK
Heartbreak (22 June 1987 )
Kodoku Na Hurricane (孤独なハリケーン Kodoku Na Harikēn, Lonely Hurricane) (September 9, 1987)
Kanashimi Swing (悲しみSWING ) (November 25, 1987)
Anata To Nettai (あなたと、熱帯, With You, Tropical) (July 6, 1988) as "Minako With Wildcats"
Stand Up～Full Metal Armor (November 30, 1988) as "Minako With Wildcats"
Katte Ni Sasete (勝手にさせて, Let Me Have My Own Way) (May 31, 1989) as "Minako With Wildcats"
7th Bird "Ai Ni Koi" (愛に恋 Love And Love) (October 11, 1989)
Shangri-La (July 4, 1990)
Tsubasa (つばさ, Wings) (May 25, 1994)
Rarabai~Yasashiku Dakasete~ (ら・ら・ば・い～優しく抱かせて, Lullaby~Let Me Hold You Kindly) (May 10, 1995) (2nd ending theme of Magic Knight Rayearth)
Boku No Heya De Kurasou (僕の部屋で暮らそう, Let's Live in My Room) (July 26, 1995)
Fall in Love With You -Koi Ni Ochite- (恋に落ちて, Fall in Love) (November 6, 1995)
Shining Eyes (July 21, 1996)
Kaze No Uta (風のうた, Wind Song) (November 21, 1999) (ending theme song of Hunter × Hunter)
Honey (October 21, 2000)
Hoshizora (星空, Starlit Sky) (January 24, 2001)
Nadja!! (ナージャ!! Nādja!!) (February 21, 2003) (theme song of Ashita no Nadja)
Shinsekai (新世界, New World) (May 14, 2004)

Albums

Studio albums
 M'Syndrome (M'シンドロームEmu'Shindorōmu) (November 21, 1985)
 Lips (June 4, 1986)
 Cancel (September 28, 1986)
 Oversea (June 22, 1987)
 Midnight Swing (December 15, 1988)
 Hyōteki (豹的, Target) (July 5, 1989) as "Minako With Wildcats"
 Wild Cats (August 4, 1989) as "Minako With Wildcats"
 Junction (September 24, 1994)
 Hare Tokidoki Kumori (晴れ ときどき くもり, Fine, Sometimes Cloudy) (June 25, 1995)
 Ave Maria (May 21, 2003)
 Toki (時, Time) (November 25, 2004)
 Amazing Grace (アメイジング・グレイス Ameijingu Gureisu) (October 19, 2005)
 Kokoro Wo Komete... (心を込めて... Heartily) (April 20, 2006)
 Yasashii Sekai (優しい世界 Gentle World) (December 6, 2006)
 Eternal Harmony (November 6, 2008)
 Last Concert (ラスト・コンサート) (December 10, 2008)

Live albums
 The Virgin Concert (ザ・ヴァージン・コンサート Za Vājin Consāto) (February 20, 1986)
 DISPA 1987 (January 24, 1989)

Compilations
 The Minako Collection (December 20, 1986)
 Golden Best- New Best Now (June 4, 1988)
 Look Over My Shoulder (October 26, 1988)
 Stand Up- Best Beat Collection (December 12, 1988)
 Life -Minako Honda: Premium Best- (May 21, 2005)
 I Love You (March 29, 2006)
 Angel Voice ~Minako Honda. Memorial Best~ (April 18, 2007)
 Classical Best ~Ten Ni Hibiku Uta~ (April 20, 2007)

Movie soundtracks
 Passenger (October 25, 1988)

VHS/DVD
 The Virgin Live in Budokan
 Dangerous Bond Street
 Dramatic Flash
 DISPA 1987
 Minako in L.A.
 Katte Ni Sasete (勝手にさせて, Let Me Have My Own Way)
 Tropical Holiday
 Tropical Holiday in Hawaii

Theatre
 Miss Saigon (1992–1993) – Kim
 Fiddler on the Roof (1994-1998) – Hodel
 The King and I (1996–2002) – Tuptim
 Les Misérables (1997–2001) – Eponine
 Himeyuri (2002-2004) – Kimi
 Twelfth Night (2003) – A Cat
 Claudia (2004) – Claudia
Note: Minako Honda was originally cast as Fantine in Les Misérables for the Japanese tour in 2005, but due to her death, another actor was given the part.

References

External links

 Minako Honda's official page 
 Web page by Columbia record 
 Live for Life web page 
 Minako Honda discography 
 Nippop – Minako Honda Profile 
 Japan will miss its Miss Saigon MSN-Mainichi Daily News 

1967 births
2005 deaths
Deaths from leukemia
Japanese actresses
Japanese women pop singers
Japanese female idols
Actors from Saitama Prefecture
Deaths from cancer in Japan
Nippon Columbia artists
Musicians from Saitama Prefecture
20th-century Japanese women singers
20th-century Japanese singers
21st-century Japanese women singers
21st-century Japanese singers